The Young Democrats of Utah (YDU) is an official caucus of the Utah Democratic Party. The group's membership is open to all Utah Democrats under the age of 36.

Leadership 
YDU membership elects its officers at its annual convention. Its executive committee consists of the President, the Vice President, the Secretary, the Treasurer, the Communications Director, two National Committee Representatives, and the Chair from each of its two sub-caucuses. Those two caucuses are the Young Professional Democrats of Utah and the High School Democrats of Utah.

President: Tyrell Aagard
Vice-President: Christopher Foote
Secretary: Emma Fetzer
Treasurer: Caleb Uhl
National Committee Representative: Jack Davis
National Committee Representative: Angela Charles
Communications Director: Marta Hubbard
Young Professionals Caucus Chair: vacant
High School Caucus Chair: Sandrine Mimche

See also 
Young Democrats of America
College Democrats
High School Democrats of America

External links 
Young Democrats of Utah

References 

Democratic Party (United States) organizations
Youth-led organizations
Young Democrats of America
2003 establishments in Utah
Organizations established in 2003